Bank of Pilot Mountain is a historic bank building located at Pilot Mountain, Surry County, North Carolina. It was built in 1900, and is a two-story, five bay by seven bay, rectangular Queen Anne style red brick building. It has round-arched brickwork at the entrance topped by a domed turret.  It originally housed the Pilot Bank and Trust Company, then the Bank of Pilot Mountain from 1914 to 1986.

It was listed on the National Register of Historic Places in 1997.

References

Bank buildings on the National Register of Historic Places in North Carolina
Queen Anne architecture in North Carolina
Commercial buildings completed in 1900
Buildings and structures in Surry County, North Carolina
National Register of Historic Places in Surry County, North Carolina